Sachaai is a 1969 Indian Bollywood film directed by K. Shankar and produced by M.C. Ramamurthy, nephew of M.G.Ramachandran. It stars Shammi Kapoor, Sanjeev Kumar and Sadhana in pivotal roles. This is remake of Pandhayam.

Plot

Ashok and Kishore are room-mates, living in a hostel. While Ashok takes to crime and dishonesty, Kishore is honest to a fault. When Kishore finds that his father has been taking bribes, he leaves home angrily. Ashok and he disagree on a number of issues, mainly involving honesty, and both agree to meet each other after a period of three years, and see what life has had an effect for them. Kishore gets into bad company inadvertently, and is unable to free himself, and gets deeper and deeper into crime. Meanwhile, Ashok realizes it is not worthwhile to pursue a criminal career, and becomes a police inspector. Kishore is now known as the notorious Baghi Sitara, and Ashok is assigned the task of apprehending him. The two are unaware of each other's identity. Kishore learns of this assignment and his men kidnap Ashok, but Ashok manages to escape. Kishore must kill Ashok in order to carry out his nefarious activities. After three years, the two have an emotional meeting, delighted to see other.

Cast
 Shammi Kapoor as Ashok
 Sanjeev Kumar as Kishore 
 Sadhana as Shobha 
 Pran as Prakash
 Johnny Walker as Chaman
 Helen as Meena
 Raj Mehra as Dindayal
 Sulochana Latkar as Mrs. Dindayal

Soundtrack
All lyrics written by Rajendra Krishan.

External links

1960s Hindi-language films
1969 films
Films scored by Shankar–Jaikishan
Films directed by K. Shankar